Ramazan Serkan Kılıç (born May 31, 1984, in Ankara) is a Turkish volleyball player. He is 187 cm and plays as libero. He has been playing for Fenerbahçe Grundig since 2008 and wears the number 18. He played 63 times for the national team and also played for SGK and Hatay Polis Gücü.

Honours and awards
 2007-08 Turkish Men's Volleyball League Champion
 2008-09 Turkish Men's Volleyball League runner-up
 2008-09 Turkish Cup Champion
 2009-10 Balkan Champion
 2009-10 Turkish Men's Volleyball League Champion
 2010-11 Turkish Men's Volleyball League Champion
 2011-12 Turkish Men's Volleyball League Champion
 2011-12 Turkish Cup Champion
 2011-12 Turkish Super Cup Champion
 2013-14 CEV Challenge Cup Champion

External links 
 Player profile at fenerbahce.org

References

1984 births
Living people
Sportspeople from Ankara
Turkish men's volleyball players
Fenerbahçe volleyballers